Ethereal may refer to:
Ethereal (horse), a horse that won Australia's Caulfield Cup as well as Melbourne Cup in 2001
Ethereal wave, or simply ethereal, a subgenre of dark wave music
Wireshark, formerly named Ethereal, a free and open-source packet analyzer
Ethereal (Album), $NOT’s album

See also
Aether (disambiguation)
Ether, a class of organic compounds
Quintessence (disambiguation)

ru:Ethereal